Rock City is the debut studio album by American heavy metal band Riot; it was released in 1977.

It was first released independently by Fire Sign Records, run by the band's producers, Billy Arnell and Steve Loeb, who also owned the Greene Street Recording Studio, before the album was picked up for wider distribution by Canada's Attic Records and by VIctor Entertainment in Japan. Vinyl copies of Rock City can be differentiated by the color that frames the front cover artwork.  The original Fire Sign pressing is framed in white; later editions are framed in black or lack this feature altogether.

American label Metal Blade Records re-issued the album on CD in early 1993 and again in 2015.

Rock City is the only Riot album to feature writing and recording contributions by original bassist Phil Feit who went on to join acts such as Billy Idol, playing on his hits Hot in the City and White Wedding, Joan Jett & The Blackhearts, and Adam Bomb, where he briefly crossed paths with another Riot member, drummer Sandy Slavin.

Track listing

Personnel
Guy Speranza – vocals
Mark Reale – guitars
Lou A. Kouvaris – guitars
Jimmy Iommi – bass (2, 4, 6-9)
Peter Bitelli – drums
Phil Feit – bass (1, 3, 5)

References

 

Riot V albums
1977 debut albums